Parnell may refer to:

People

Surname
Anna Catherine Parnell (1852–1911), Irish nationalist
Archie Parnell, American political candidate
Arthur Parnell (died 1935), British Anglican priest
Babe Parnell (1901–1982), American football player
Bobby Parnell (born 1984), American baseball pitcher
Charles Stewart Parnell (1846–1891), Irish politician
Charles Parnell (actor), American actor
Chris Parnell (born 1967), American actor and comedian
Clare Parnell (born 1970), British astrophysicist and applied mathematician
Edward Parnell (politician) (1859–1922), Mayor of Winnipeg, Canada
Edward Parnell (sport shooter) (1875–1941), British Olympic sport shooter
Emory Parnell (1892–1979), American vaudevillian and actor
Fanny Parnell (1848-1882), Irish poet and nationalist
Harvey Parnell (1880–1936), American politician, governor of Arkansas
Henry Parnell (1776–1842), Irish writer and Whig politician
Kenneth Eugene Parnell (1931-2008), American kidnapper and child-molester
John Parnell (disambiguation), several people
Lee Roy Parnell (born 1956), American country music and blues artist
Mark Parnell (born 1959), Australian politician
Mel Parnell (1922–2012), American baseball pitcher
Nicholas Parnell (born 1990), British fashion stylist
Peter Parnell (born 1953), American playwright
Reg Parnell (1911–1964), English racing driver and team manager
Richard Parnell (1810–1882), British physician and naturalist
Samuel Duncan Parnell (1810–1890), New Zealand settler
Sean Parnell (born 1962), American politician, governor of Alaska
Stewart Parnell, owner of Peanut Corporation of America, imprisoned for shipping contaminated food
Thomas Parnell (1679–1718), Anglo-Irish poet and clergyman
Thomas Parnell (scientist) (1881–1948), English-Australian physicist
Thomas Frederick Parnell, birth name of Fred Russell (ventriloquist) (1862–1957), English ventriloquist
Tim Parnell (1932–2017), British racing driver and team manager
Val Parnell (1892–1972), British television managing director and theatrical impresario
Wayne Parnell (born 1989), South African cricketer
William R. Parnell (1836–1910), Irish-born adventurer and soldier

Given name
Parnell Motley (born 1997), American football player

Places
New Zealand
Parnell, New Zealand
Parnell (New Zealand electorate)
United States
Parnell, Illinois
Parnell, Iowa
Parnell, Kansas
Parnell, Michigan
Parnell, Missouri
Parnell, Wisconsin

Film
Parnell (film), starring Clark Gable and Myrna Loy

English-language surnames